Ogbe Ijaw is a town in Delta State, Nigeria near the city of Warri. The people who live here are mainly of the Ijaw tribe.

Populated places in Delta State